The 2011 Breeders' Cup Classic was the 28th running of the Breeders' Cup Classic, part of the 2011 Breeders' Cup World Thoroughbred Championships program. It was run on November 5, 2011 at Churchill Downs in Louisville, Kentucky with a purse of $5,000,000.

Drosselmeyer, a 15-1 longshot who was in tenth place with a quarter mile left in the race, closed rapidly and won by a length and a half over another longshot, Game On Dude. With none of the favorites finishing in the top three, the superfecta paid $41,631.80.

The Classic is run on dirt at one mile and one-quarter (approximately 2000 m). It is run under weight-for-age conditions, with entrants carrying the following weights:
Northern Hemisphere three-year-olds: 
Southern Hemisphere three-year-olds: 
Four-year-olds and up: 
Any fillies or mares receive a  allowance

Contenders
The field for the Classic lacked in star power, especially when compared to the 2010 running featuring Zenyatta and Blame. However, the field was very deep with most of the entries given a legitimate chance of winning. The leading contenders included:
 Uncle Mo, who was the previous year's two-year-old champion but missed the Kentucky Derby due to illness. Recovered to win the Kelso Handicap in October and was the morning line favorite but had never raced at  miles
 Flat Out, who was the lukewarm post-time favorite for the race after winning the Jockey Club Gold Cup
 Havre de Grace, a highly regarded filly who had defeated Flat Out in the Woodward Stakes but had never won at  miles
 So You Think, a New Zealand-bred five-year-old with three European Group I wins in 2011 in but who had never raced on the dirt
 Game On Dude, winner of the Santa Anita Handicap and Goodwood Stakes. Ridden by Chantal Sutherland, who hoped to become the first woman jockey to win the Classic
 Stay Thirsty, winner of the Travers Stakes
 Drosselmeyer, winner of the 2010 Belmont Stakes and runner-up in the Jockey Club Gold Cup

Race Description
Game On Dude went to the lead but was challenged by Uncle Mo. The two set moderate early fractions, followed closely by a large pack of challengers. Turning into the stretch, Uncle Mo hit the lead but then faded, eventually finishing tenth. Game On Dude then repelled challenges from To Honor and Serve and So You Think, opening up a one length lead in mid-stretch. Meanwhile, Drosselmeyer had raced near the back of the field, over ten lengths behind the leaders. He started to make up ground around the far turn but was still in tenth place with a quarter of a mile remaining. Swinging wide, he put in a burst of speed and swept past Game On Dude in the final strides, winning by a length and a half.

One of the biggest stories after the race centered on the fact that Drosselmeyer's jockey Mike Smith had once been engaged to Sutherland on Game On Dude. Sutherland had thought she would win, only to see Smith move past her near the finish line. "I'm very proud of my horse, very proud of myself. I had an amazing time," she said after the race. "And I'm happy for Mike. But really? Really? Of all people."

For Smith, it was a "redemption" of sorts after the defeat of Zenyatta the year before. "Compared to last year, this is incredible. Last year still hurts like nothing ever before in my life," he said. "The key to this horse is you gotta' keep him moving, gotta' keep pedaling. He can run all day." It was Smith's fifteenth Breeders' Cup win, tying him for the all-time lead with Jerry Bailey. 

Drosselmeyer's trainer, Bill Mott, had previously won the Classic with Cigar in 1995. He also won the Ladies' Classic with Royal Delta on the Friday card.

Results

Source: Equibase

Times:  – 0:23.61;   – 0:47.84;  – 1:12.82; mile – 1:38.27;  final – 2:04.27.
Fractional Splits: (:23.61) (:24.23) (:24.98) (:25.45) (:26.00)

Payout
Payout Schedule:

 $2 Exacta (3-8) Paid $444.80
 $2 Trifecta (3-8-4) Paid $5,427.40
 $2 Superfecta (3-8-4-10) Paid $47,631.80

References

Breeders' Cup
Breeders' Cup Classic
Breeders' Cup Classic
Breeders' Cup Classic, 2011